Blendi Sokoli (born 9 September 1971) is an Albanian former footballer who played as a midfielder. He spent most of his career in Germany. He made one appearance for the Albania national team in 1992.

References

External links
 

1971 births
Living people
Sportspeople from Tirana
Albanian footballers
Association football midfielders
Albania international footballers
FC Schalke 04 II players
SV Wilhelmshaven players
SpVg Aurich players
Albanian expatriate footballers
Albanian expatriate sportspeople in Germany
Expatriate footballers in Germany